Doug Wiles is a resident of St. Augustine, Florida where he is the President of Herbie Wiles Insurance.

Wiles previously served as a Representative in the Florida House of Representatives from 1996–2004, serving as the Democratic Leader from 2002-2004. Wiles is a third-generation public servant, following in the footsteps of both his father, Herbie Wiles and his grandfather, Randy Wiles, who both served on the St. Johns County Commission. While currently out-of-office, Wiles is mentioned from time to time as a potential candidate, either for the State Senate or Congress.

Wiles received his Bachelor's degree from the University of Florida in journalism. He is also a retired Lt. Colonel, serving nearly 25 years in the United States Army and the Florida National Guard, which included a short stint in Saudi Arabia during Operation Desert Shield.

He and his wife, Doris, have two daughters, Lindsay and Ashley and six grandchildren.

External links
Official Website of Wiles

University of Florida alumni
1952 births
Living people
Democratic Party members of the Florida House of Representatives
Amateur radio people